"Sawah" (meaning wanderer in Arabic) is an iconic song by Egyptian pan-Arab singer Abdel Halim Hafez (in Arabic عبد الحليم حافظ) and one of his best known.

The song lyrics are entirely in Egyptian Arabic. The lyrics are by Mohamed Hamza (in Arabic محمد حافظ) and the music by Baligh Hamdi (in Arabic بليغ حمدي).

Ishtar version

The French-Israeli singer Ishtar released an alternative version of the song. The release is known as  "Habibi (Sawah)" and is performed by as a remix of the original Abdel Halim Hafez song.

External links 
Ishtar's official web site

Egyptian songs
Arabic-language songs